The Japan Credit Rating Agency (JCR), established in 1985, is a Japanese financial services company which publishes credit ratings to Japanese companies, local governments, and other interested parties. The company is one of the Japanese credit rating agencies which the Japanese financial service agency has approved as eligible for Japanese local banks to utilize under the Basel II framework. Currently, the Japan Credit Rating Agency has 584 million yen in paid-in capital.

External links

Credit rating agencies
Finance in Japan